The 1965 All-Africa Games football tournament was the 1st edition of the African Games men's football tournament. The football tournament was held in Brazzaville, the Republic of the Congo between 19–25 July 1965 as part of the 1965 All-Africa Games.

Qualified teams

The following countries have qualified for the final tournament:

Squads

Group stage

Group 1

Group 2

Knockout stage

Semifinals

Third place match

Final

Classification matches
5th place bracket

5–8th place semifinals

Seventh place match

Fifth place match

Final ranking

External links
All-African Games 1965 - rsssf.com

1965
1965 All-Africa Games
All-Africa Games